Rolando Carlos Schiavi (born 18 January 1973) is a retired Argentine football defender, most recognized for his time spent playing for Boca Juniors.

Club career
Schiavi started his career in the lower leagues with Argentino de Rosario, before moving to Argentinos Juniors in 1995. Schiavi played for Argentinos for six years, before joining Boca Juniors. He played 186 games for Boca between 2001 and 2005, scoring 22 goals, including 122 league games with 12 goals. During his tenure at Boca, Schiavi won seven major titles and one minor title.

In 2006, Boca transferred Schiavi to Spanish club Hércules CF for €550,000. The Spanish episode was short, as Schiavi returned to South America to join Brazilian club Grêmio in 2007.

During the June–July 2007 transfer window, Schiavi returned to Argentina to sign for Newell's Old Boys. On 2 November 2008, the defender scored the decisive penalty in a 1-0 win over Rosario Central in the Rosario derby.

On 22 June 2009, Newells' Old Boys agreed to loan Schiavi to Estudiantes de La Plata for their upcoming Copa Libertadores matches. Per the agreement, Estudiantes paid Newell's US$100,000 plus insurance and the player's wages. Schiavi played in both legs of the semifinal and of the final to help Estudiantes win the Copa Libertadores title.

International career

In September 2009, Schiavi was called up for the first time to the Argentina national football team prior to a World Cup qualifier match against Brazil. He made his debut coming on as an 80th-minute substitute for Sebastián Domínguez in a 1-0 defeat against Paraguay.

Coaching career
After retiring, Shiavi was appointed assistant coach of Martín Palermo at Arsenal de Sarandí in April 2014. He left the position at the end of the year.

On 9 January 2015, Schiavi was appointed reserve team manager of Boca Juniors. He was fired in December 2019.

Honours
Boca Juniors
Argentine Primera División (3): 2003 Apertura, 2005 Apertura, 2011 Apertura
Copa Argentina (1): 2012
Copa Libertadores (1): 2003
Intercontinental Cup (1): 2003
Copa Sudamericana (1): 2004
Recopa Sudamericana (1): 2005
Grêmio
Campeonato Gaúcho (1): 2007
Estudiantes
Copa Libertadores (1): 2009

References

External links
 Argentine Primera statistics at Fútbol XXI 

1973 births
Living people
People from Lincoln Partido
Argentine people of Italian descent
Argentine footballers
Association football defenders
Argentinos Juniors footballers
Argentina international footballers
Boca Juniors footballers
Hércules CF players
Grêmio Foot-Ball Porto Alegrense players
Newell's Old Boys footballers
Estudiantes de La Plata footballers
Chinese Super League players
Shanghai Shenhua F.C. players
Expatriate footballers in Spain
Expatriate footballers in Brazil
Expatriate footballers in China
Argentine expatriate sportspeople in Spain
Argentine expatriate sportspeople in Brazil
Argentine expatriate sportspeople in China
Argentine Primera División players
Argentino de Rosario footballers
Argentine expatriate footballers
Argentine football managers
Sportspeople from Buenos Aires Province